Chapel of Love is the debut studio album by the New Orleans pop girl group The Dixie Cups. The album was produced by Jerry Leiber, Mike Stoller, Jeff Barry and Ellie Greenwich. It includes 11 tracks and was first released on Red Bird Records in August 1964. It was available in both mono and stereo, catalogue numbers RB 20-100 and RBS 20-100.

The album features the group's debut breakthrough hit, the number one smash on the Hot 100, "Chapel of Love". It also includes the hit singles "People Say" and "Iko Iko". Both "Chapel of Love" and "People Say" were written by Jeff Barry and Ellie Greenwich.

Other songs on the Chapel of Love album include the fourth and final single taken from the album, "Gee the Moon Is Shining Bright", originally recorded by Ronnie Spector under the title "Why Don't They Let Us Fall in Love". The Dixie Cups version is a slight rework of the lyrics. Although the group had scored three major hits, the album only charted at number 112 on the U.S. Billboard 200 Albums chart.

Track listing
All tracks arranged by Mike Stoller; except where indicated

Side 1
"Chapel of Love" (Jeff Barry, Ellie Greenwich, Phil Spector) arranged by Mike Stoller and Joe Jones – 2:51
"Gee the Moon Is Shining Bright" (Jeff Barry, Ellie Greenwich, Phil Spector) – 2:30
"I'm Gonna Get You Yet" (Earl King Johnson) arranged by Joe Jones and Wardell Quezergue – 2:30
"Ain't That Nice" (Earl King Johnson) arranged by Joe Jones and Wardell Quezergue – 2:20
"Thank You Mama, Thank You Papa" (Ernestine Gaines) arranged by Joe Jones and Wardell Quezergue – 2:41
"Another Boy Like Mine" (Jeff Barry, Ellie Greenwich) – 2:54

Side 2
"Gee Baby Gee" (Jeff Barry, Ellie Greenwich) – 2:26
"Iko Iko" (Barbara Anne Hawkins, Rosa Lee Hawkins, Joan Marie Johnson) – 2:05
"Girls Can Tell" (Jeff Barry, Ellie Greenwich, Phil Spector) – 2:38
"All Grown Up" (Jeff Barry, Ellie Greenwich, Phil Spector) – 2:00
"People Say" (Jeff Barry, Ellie Greenwich) – 2:52

Personnel
Barbara Hawkins – lead and backing vocals
Rosa Hawkins – lead and backing vocals
Joan Johnson – lead and backing vocals
Technical
Brooks Arthur - engineer
Loring Eutemey - cover design
Hugh Bell - cover photography

Singles history
"Chapel of Love" b/w "Ain't That Nice" (U.S. #1, UK #22 1964)
"People Say" b/w "Girls Can Tell" (U.S. #12 1964)
"Iko Iko" b/w "Gee Baby Gee" (U.S. #20, UK #23 1965)
”Gee the Moon Is Shining Bright" b/w "I'm Gonna Get You Yet" (U.S. #102 1965)

Re-release
In 1965, Red Bird Records re-packaged the Chapel of Love album under the new title of Iko Iko with new cover art. The album is the same as their debut release and does not include any new tracks. Iko Iko was available only in mono, catalogue number RB 20-103. In 1997, the Iko Iko version of the album was issued on compact disc for the first time through the Marginal Records label.

References

1964 debut albums
Red Bird Records albums
Albums produced by Jeff Barry
Albums produced by Ellie Greenwich
Albums produced by Mike Stoller
Albums produced by Jerry Leiber